Daniel Stashower is an American author and editor of mystery fiction and historical nonfiction. He lives in Maryland.

Awards and honors
Stashower has received awards and recognition for several of his works.

Fiction
The mystery novel The Adventure of the Ectoplasmic Man was a 1986 Edgar Award nominee for best first novel.

The short story "A Deliberate Form of Frenzy" was nominated for the 1998 Agatha Award for best short story.

Nonfiction
Teller of Tales: The Life of Arthur Conan Doyle was the 1999 Agatha Award winner for best nonfiction, the 2000 Edgar Award winner for best critical/biographical work, a 2000 Anthony Award nominee for best critical nonfiction work, and a 2000 Macavity Award nominee for best nonfiction.

The Beautiful Cigar Girl was a 2006 Agatha Award nominee for best nonfiction and a 2007 Edgar Award nominee for best fact crime.

Arthur Conan Doyle: A Life in Letters was the 2007 Agatha Award winner for best nonfiction, the 2008 Edgar Award winner for best critical/biographical work, and the 2008 Anthony Award winner for best critical work.

The Hour of Peril was the 2013 Agatha Award winner for best nonfiction, the 2014 Edgar Award winner for best fact crime, a 2014 Anthony Award nominee for best critical or nonfiction work, was a New York Times best seller and editors' choice, and was on the Washington Posts list of Notable Nonfiction of 2013.

Books

Fiction
 
 
 
 
 
 
 
 
 
 
 

 Anthologies 

 Meanwhile, Far Across the Caspian Sea ... (Aug 2010) in Death's Excellent Vacation'

Nonfiction

References

External links

1960 births
Living people
People from Cleveland
American male writers
Writers from Maryland
Agatha Award winners
Anthony Award winners